Patches & Pockets was a Saturday morning television show that aired for over eighteen years in Toledo, Ohio on TV channel 11, WTOL. The title characters were a brother and sister pair of rag dolls played by Bev Schwind and Sue Donner, respectively. Both lived in Port Clinton, Ohio.

The rag dolls lived in a toy box with their large stuffed red dog. They went about their day entertaining children on the set and having misadventures in the studio "Neighborhood" or at various sites in the Toledo Metropolitan area. (Toledo-Lucas County Public Library, Toledo Zoo, etc.). One of the rag dolls would inevitably get in some trouble and they would find a way to work through the problem. It was a morality show with Patches (Female Rag Doll) having a dilemma or Pockets (Male Rag Doll) creating mischief. Pockets would tell time by looking at his ruler. When Pockets had to concentrate, he would put his shoe on his head.

The opening and closing theme music is excerpted from "The Citizen Kane Overture" by Bernard Hermann.

Marlene "Sue" Donner died of heart failure on June 26, 2011, at the age of 78, in the Erie County Care Facility in Huron, Ohio.

References

External links
Patches and Pockets clips (1, 2, 3)

American children's television series
Local children's television programming in the United States